Svemir Delić (14 September 1929 – 3 January 2017), nicknamed Cico, was a Croatian footballer who played as a defender and made one appearance for the Croatia national team.

International career
Delić earned his first and only cap for Croatia in the team's 1956 friendly match against Indonesia. The fixture, which was played on 12 September in Zagreb, finished as a 5–2 win for Croatia.

Personal life
Delić's brother Mladen was a prominent Croatian sports commentator. Svemir was married to Mirjana for over 60 years, and died on 3 January 2017 in Split at the age of 87.

Career statistics

International

References

External links
 

1929 births
2017 deaths
People from Sinj
Yugoslav footballers
Croatian footballers
Croatia international footballers
Association football fullbacks
Association football central defenders
NK Junak Sinj players
GNK Dinamo Zagreb players
HNK Hajduk Split players
NK Zagreb players
Yugoslav First League players